Jukka Turunen (born 29 January 1964) is a retired Finnish footballer who played as a forward.

Honours

 1989 Finnish Cup
 1992 Finnish Cup

External links
 
 

1964 births
Living people
Finnish footballers
Association football forwards
Myllykosken Pallo −47 players
Finland international footballers
People from Kuopio
Sportspeople from North Savo